Bighapur is a town and nagar panchayat in Unnao district of Uttar Pradesh, India. First officially classified as a town for the 1981 census, it now serves as a tehsil headquarters(established in Patan). Important items manufactured here include clay pots, leather products, and wooden furniture. As of 2011, the population of Bighapur is 6,501, in 1,201 households.

Bighapur is the headquarters of a community development block, which was first inaugurated on 1 October 1959 in order to oversee implementation of India's Five-Year Plans at a local and rural level. As of 2011, the block comprises 128 rural villages, with a total population of 136,589 people in 27,180 households.

Demographics

According to the 2011 census, Bighapur has a population of 6,501 people, in 1,201 households. The town's sex ratio is 927 females to every 1000 males;  3,374 of Bighapur's residents are male (52%) and 3,127 are female (48%). The 0-6 age group makes up about 10.1% of the town's population; the sex ratio for this group is 918, which is higher than the district urban average of 903. Members of Scheduled Castes make up 25.75% of the town's population, while no members of Scheduled Tribes were recorded. The town's literacy rate was 80.9% (counting only people age 7 and up); literacy was higher among men and boys (87.7%) than among women and girls (73.5%). The scheduled castes literacy rate is 70.8% (78.2% among men and boys, and 62.6% among women and girls).

In terms of employment, 22.8% of Nawabganj residents were classified as main workers (i.e. people employed for at least 6 months per year) in 2011. Marginal workers (i.e. people employed for less than 6 months per year) made up 11.6%, and the remaining 65.5% were non-workers. Employment status varied significantly according to gender, with 53.2% of men being either main or marginal workers, compared to only 14.2% of women.

27.2% of Bighapur residents live in slum conditions as of 2011. There are 4 slum areas in Bighapur: Nageshwar Nagar, Shastri Nagar, Gandhi Nagar, and Sandhohi Nagar (the largest). These range in size from about 60 to 150 households and have between 5 and 50 tap water access points. The number of flush toilets installed in people's homes ranges from 10 to 35. All 4 areas are serviced by open sewers.

Education
Degree colleges:
 Maha Pran Nirala (MPN) Degree College, Osiya, Bighapur, Unnao
 Sardar Patel Banshgopal Sanatan Dharm Degree College, Mahai, Bighapur, Unnao
 Raghuraja Degree College

Inter Colleges:
 Kamlapati Inter College
 Lahshmi Narayan Public Inter College
 Parwati Balika Inter College
 Saraswati Gyan Mandir Inter College
 Patiraja Inter College

Healthcare
Bighapur has one block level hospital near BSNL telephone exchange, Bighapur.

Transport

Rail
Bighapur Railway Station is the junction point for Rae Bareli, unchahar, Kanpur, Unnao. There are total 4 passenger trains which are passes through Bighapur Railway Station and has stoppage also.

Road
Bighapur is situated just 30 km away from Unnao Bypass Gate near Nirala Nagar and distance from Raebareli, Uttar Pradesh is approx 70 km. Distance between Bighapur and Kanpur is only 40 km.

Villages 
Bighapur CD block has the following 128 villages:

References

Cities and towns in Unnao district